USA-251, also known as GPS IIF-6, GPS SVN-67 and NAVSTAR 70, is an American navigation satellite which forms part of the Global Positioning System. It was the sixth of twelve Block IIF satellites to be launched.

Launch 
Built by Boeing and launched by United Launch Alliance, USA-251 was launched at 00:03 UTC on 17 May 2014, atop a Delta IV carrier rocket, flight number D366, flying in the Medium+(4,2) configuration. The launch took place from Space Launch Complex 37B at the Cape Canaveral Air Force Station, and placed USA-251 directly into medium Earth orbit.

Orbit 
It is used to broadcast the PRN 06 signal, and operates in slot 6 of plane D of the GPS constellation.
 It is currently in service following commissioning on June 10, 2014.

References 

Spacecraft launched in 2014
GPS satellites
USA satellites
Spacecraft launched by Delta IV rockets